William Joseph Browne,  (May 3, 1897 – January 10, 1989) was a Canadian lawyer, judge and politician. He served in the Newfoundland House of Assembly and the House of Commons of Canada.

The son of Liberius Browne and Bridget O'Reilly, he was born in St. John's, Newfoundland and was educated at Holy Cross School, Saint Bonaventure's College, Merton College, Oxford, the University of Toronto and Gray's Inn in London. Browne was called to the bars of both England and Newfoundland in 1922 and practised law in Newfoundland.

Browne ran unsuccessfully for the Placentia-St. Mary's seat in the Newfoundland assembly in 1923. He was elected for St. John's West in 1924 and defeated when he ran for reelection in 1928. He was elected to the assembly again in 1932 for Harbour Main-Bell Island and so was a member of the last Newfoundland House of Assembly in 1933 when the Commission of Government took over governing Newfoundland. He was a cabinet minister in the government of Frederick C. Alderdice, first serving as a minister without portfolio and then as Minister of Finance and Customs and Minister of Justice.

In 1934, he was named King's Counsel. From 1934 to 1939, Browne was a judge in the Central District Court. In 1949, he was elected to the House of Commons of Canada in the riding of St. John's West. A Progressive Conservative, he was defeated in the 1953 federal election. He was elected again to the House of Assembly in 1954. He was re-elected to the House of Commons in the 1957 and 1958 elections. He was defeated in the 1962 election and again in the 1965 election. From 1957 to 1960, he was a Minister without Portfolio in the cabinet of John Diefenbaker. From 1960 to 1962, he was the Solicitor General of Canada. He retired from politics in 1962 and returned to the practice of law.

In 1981, he published his biography, Eighty-four years a Newfoundlander: Memoirs of William J. Browne.

He was married four times: first to Mary Grace Harris in 1924, to Mary Roche in 1933, to Margaret Fleming (née Buckley) in 1951., and to Dr Norah Elphinstone Renouf in 1970, outliving all his wives except for Norah, who died November 24, 2010.

Browne died in St. John's at the age of 91.

There is a William Joseph Browne fonds at Library and Archives Canada.

References
 

1897 births
1989 deaths
Members of the House of Commons of Canada from Newfoundland and Labrador
Members of the King's Privy Council for Canada
Members of the Newfoundland and Labrador House of Assembly
Politicians from St. John's, Newfoundland and Labrador
Progressive Conservative Party of Canada MPs
Solicitors General of Canada
Canadian King's Counsel
Dominion of Newfoundland judges
Government ministers of the Dominion of Newfoundland
Alumni of Merton College, Oxford